Dwight Foster (December 7, 1757 – April 29, 1823) was an American lawyer and politician from Massachusetts. He served in the Massachusetts House of Representatives, the United States House of Representatives and the United States Senate.

Early life
Foster was born in Brookfield in the Province of Massachusetts Bay, and attended the common schools in Brookfield. He graduated from the College in the English Colony of Rhode Island and Providence Plantations (the former name of Brown University) at Providence in 1774. He then studied law and was admitted to the bar association in 1778. He remained in Rhode Island to practice law, beginning his law practice in Providence. He received his Master's degree from Harvard University in 1784.

Career
After returning to Massachusetts, Foster held various positions in the government. He served as justice of the peace for Worcester County from 1781 to 1823, as special justice of the court of common pleas in 1792, and as sheriff of Worcester County in 1792. In 1791, he was elected as a Federalist candidate to the Massachusetts House of Representatives.

He was elected as a United States House of Representatives to the 3rd United States Congress in 1793, and was reelected to the three  succeeding Congresses, defeating Levi Lincoln, Sr. each time. He served in Congress from March 4, 1793, until his resignation on June 6, 1800. While in Congress, he was Chairman of the United States Senate Committee on Claims.

In 1799, he was a delegate to the State constitutional convention  and on June 6, 1800, he was elected to the United States Senate to fill the vacancy caused by Samuel Dexter's resignation. He served in the Senate until his resignation on March 3, 1803. He was a member of the State House from 1808 to 1809 and a member of the Massachusetts Governor's Council in 1818.

In 1813 he was elected a member of the American Antiquarian Society.

Foster died in Brookfield on April 29, 1823, aged 65, and is interred in Brookfield Cemetery there.

Family life
Foster's father was Massachusetts Supreme Judicial Court Justice Jedediah Foster,  who graduated from Harvard University in 1744. Foster married Rebecca Faulkner on May 7, 1783, and they had one son, Alfred Dwight Foster.

He was the brother of U.S. Senator Theodore Foster, and was the grandfather and namesake of Massachusetts Attorney General and Massachusetts Supreme Judicial Court Justice Dwight Foster MA.

References

External links
 

1757 births
1823 deaths
People from Brookfield, Massachusetts
People of colonial Massachusetts
American people of English descent
Pro-Administration Party members of the United States House of Representatives from Massachusetts
Federalist Party members of the United States House of Representatives from Massachusetts
Federalist Party United States senators from Massachusetts
Members of the Massachusetts Governor's Council
Members of the Massachusetts House of Representatives
Sheriffs of Worcester County, Massachusetts
Massachusetts lawyers
Politicians from Providence, Rhode Island
19th-century American lawyers
Brown University alumni
Harvard University alumni
Members of the American Antiquarian Society
Burials in Massachusetts